The Udi language, spoken by the Udi people, is a member of the Lezgic branch of the Northeast Caucasian language family. It is believed an earlier form of it was the main language of Caucasian Albania, which stretched from south Dagestan to current day Azerbaijan. The Old Udi language is also called the Caucasian Albanian language and possibly corresponds to the "Gargarian" language identified by medieval Armenian historians. Modern Udi is known simply as Udi.

The language is spoken by about 4000 people in the village of Nij, Azerbaijan, in Qabala District, in Oghuz District, as well as in parts of North Caucasus in Russia. It is also spoken by ethnic Udis living in the villages of Debetavan, Bagratashen, Ptghavan, and Haghtanak in Tavush Province of northeastern Armenia and in the village of Zinobiani (former Oktomberi) in the Qvareli Municipality of the Kakheti province of Georgia.

Udi is endangered, classified as "severely endangered" by UNESCO's Red Book of Endangered Languages.

History 
The Udi language can most appropriately be broken up into five historical stages:

Soon after the year 700, the Old Udi language had probably ceased to be used for any purpose other than as the liturgical language of the Church of Caucasian Albania.

Syntax 
Old Udi was an ergative–absolutive language.

Morphology 
Udi is agglutinating with a tendency towards being fusional. Udi affixes are mostly suffixes or infixes, but there are a few prefixes. Old Udi used mostly suffixes. Most affixes are restricted to specific parts of speech. Some affixes behave as clitics. The word order is SOV.

Udi does not have gender, but has declension classes. Old Udi, however, did reflect grammatical gender within anaphoric pronouns.

Phonology

Vowels

Consonants 

Old Udi, unlike modern Udi, did not have the close-mid front rounded vowel /ø/. Old Udi contained an additional series of palatalized consonants.

Alphabet

The Old Udi language used the Caucasian Albanian alphabet. As evidenced by Old Udi documents discovered at Saint Catherine's Monastery in Egypt dating from the 7th century, the Old Udi language used 50 of the 52 letters identified by Armenian scholars in later centuries as having been used in Udi language texts.

In the 1930s, there was an attempt by Soviet authorities to create an Udi alphabet based on the Latin alphabet but its usage ceased after a short time.

In 1974, a Udi alphabet based on the Cyrillic alphabet was compiled by V. L. Gukasyan. The alphabet in his Udi-Azerbaijani-Russian Dictionary is as follows: . This alphabet was also used in the 1996 collection Nana oččal.

In the mid-1990s, a new Latin-based Udi alphabet was created in Azerbaijan.  A primer and two collections of works by Georgy Kechaari were published using it and it was also used for educational purposes in the village of Nic. The alphabet is as follows:

In 2007 in Astrakhan, Vladislav Dabakov published a collection of Udi folklore with a Latin-based alphabet as follows:  A a, Ă ă, Ә ә, B b, C c, Ĉ ĉ, Ç ç, Ç' ç', Č č, Ć ć, D d, E e, Ĕ ĕ, F f, G g, Ğ ğ, H h, I ı, İ i, Ĭ ĭ, J j, Ĵ ĵ, K k, K' k', L l, M m, N n, O o, Ö ö, Ŏ ŏ, P p, P' p', Q q, Q' q', R r, S s, Ś ś, S' s', Ŝ ŝ, Ş ş, T t, T' t', U u, Ü ü, Ŭ ŭ, V v, X x, Y y, Z z, Ź ź.

In 2013 in Russia, an Udi primer, Nanay muz, was published with a Cyrillic-based alphabet, a modified version of the one used by V. L. Gukasyan in the Udi-Azerbaijani-Russian Dictionary. The alphabet is as follows:

See also
Languages of the Caucasus

Citations

References

Further reading

External links

Appendix:Cyrillic script
The Udi Language: A grammatical description with sample text – Wolfgang Schulze 2001
Udi basic lexicon at the Global Lexicostatistical Database
The Udis
Historical map
A Functional Grammar of Udi, Wolfgang Schulze, 2002
A Functional Grammar of Udi, Wolfgang Schulze, 2006
The cognitive dimension of clausal organization in Udi, Wolfgang Schulze, 2000
The Udi language, Wolfgang Schulze, 2002
John M. Clifton: The Sociolinguistic Situation of the Udi in Azerbaijan. SIL International, 2005. (PDF-Datei; 206 kB)

 
Northeast Caucasian languages
Languages of Azerbaijan
Languages of Georgia (country)
Endangered Caucasian languages
Severely endangered languages
Agglutinative languages